The 1964 Women's Open Squash Championships was held at the Lansdowne Club and Royal Aero Club in London from 15–21 February 1964.Heather Blundell won her third consecutive title defeating Fran Marshall for the third successive year in the final.

Seeds

Draw and results

First round

Second round

Third round

Quarter-finals

Semi-finals

Final

References

Women's British Open Squash Championships
Women's British Open Squash Championships
Women's British Open Squash Championships
Women's British Open Championships
British Open Championships
Women's British Open Squash Championships
Squash competitions in London